The 1966 Australian federal election was held in Australia on 26 November 1966. All 124 seats in the House of Representatives were up for election. The incumbent Liberal–Country coalition government, led by Prime Minister Harold Holt, won an increased majority over the opposition Labor Party, led by Arthur Calwell. This was the first and only time that a Federal Government won an eighth consecutive term in office.

Issues
Sir Robert Menzies had retired from politics in January; his successor, former Treasurer Harold Holt, was stylish, debonair and popular with the electorate, contrasting sharply with the much rougher figure of Opposition Leader Arthur Calwell, who had already lost two elections.

Calwell also came across poorly on television compared to Holt, looking and sounding older than his 70 years. It did not help that also held to the beliefs that had been central to the previous Labor Government of 1941–1949, many of which were seen as being long outdated in 1966; for example, he still defended the White Australia policy and nationalization, and also strongly supported socialism.

These factors, along with a strong economy and initial enthusiasm for Australia's involvement in the Vietnam War, virtually guaranteed the Coalition another term. The Coalition campaigned with the slogan "Keep Australia secure and prosperous – play it safe".

The election was a landslide win for the Coalition, which won twice as many seats as Labor. The Liberals arrived two seats short of a majority in their own right, the closest that the major non-Labor party had come to governing in its own right since adopting of the Liberal banner. Holt's victory was also larger than any of Menzies' eight victories, and resulted in the largest majority government in Australian history at the time. It was later seen as the electoral high point of both Holt's Prime Ministership and the 23 years of continuous Coalition rule.

Calwell retired to the backbench a month after the crushing election loss, and was succeeded by his deputy, Gough Whitlam.

Results

Independents: Sam Benson

Seats changing hands

 Members listed in italics did not contest their seat at this election.

See also
 1964 Australian Senate election
 1967 Australian Senate election
 Candidates of the Australian federal election, 1966
 Members of the Australian House of Representatives, 1966–1969

Notes

References
University of WA  election results in Australia since 1890
AEC 2PP vote
Prior to 1984 the AEC did not undertake a full distribution of preferences for statistical purposes. The stored ballot papers for the 1983 election were put through this process prior to their destruction. Therefore, the figures from 1983 onwards show the actual result based on full distribution of preferences.

Federal elections in Australia
1966 elections in Australia
November 1966 events in Australia
Landslide victories